Thomas K. Lynch is an American municipal administrator and politician who served as a member of the Massachusetts House of Representatives and as Town Manager of Barnstable, Massachusetts.

Early life
Lynch was born on April 30, 1946 in Attleboro, Massachusetts. He attended public schools in North Attleboro, Massachusetts and graduated from Boston College and Syracuse University.

Political career
From 1977 to 1985, Lynch was a member of the Massachusetts House of Representatives.

Barnstable government
From 1991 to 2007, Lynch was the executive director of the Barnstable Housing Authority. In December 2007 he was named Assistant City Manager.

In September 2011, Lynch became interim City Manager after City Manager John C. Klimm was placed on leave. When Klimm's contract ended that December, Lynch took over as Acting City Manager. On May 17, 2012, the Barnstable City Council voted 9 to 3 to offer Lynch a two-year contract to become City Manager.

References

1947 births
Boston College alumni
Massachusetts city managers
People from Barnstable, Massachusetts
Democratic Party members of the Massachusetts House of Representatives
People from Attleboro, Massachusetts
Syracuse University alumni
Living people